Shirley Ascott (10 December 1930 – 29 December 1995) was a British sprint canoer who competed in the early 1950s. She competed in the K-1 500 m event at the 1952 Summer Olympics in Helsinki, but was eliminated in the heats.

Biography
Ascott was from Hounslow, Middlesex. During the Second World War, she was evacuated, and studied at Fleetwood Grammar School. She worked in an aircraft factory, and started canoeing in 1950. In 1952, Ascott was one of two British women who attempted to qualify for the 1952 Summer Olympics; after winning the trial event, she was selected for the Games. At the Games, she was eliminated in the heats.

References

1930 births
1995 deaths
Canoeists at the 1952 Summer Olympics
Olympic canoeists of Great Britain
British female canoeists